Hypercallia citrinalis is a moth of the family Depressariidae. It is found in Europe, Asia Minor, Georgia, Armenia, Azerbaijan, Mongolia and southern Siberia (Altai, Minusinsk, Irkutsk).

The wingspan is about 19 mm.The forewings are bright yellow ; a streak along basal third of costa with two oblique projections, a slender fascia from middle of costa to 1/3 of dorsum, connected by two downward-oblique bars with an irregular interrupted subterminal fascia, second discal stigma, and a narrow terminal fascia bright crimson. Hindwings are grey. The larva is greenish-grey ; dorsal line whitish ; dots black, whitish ringed; head and 2 black - speckled.

The moth flies from June to July depending on the location.

The larvae feed on Polygala vulgaris and Polygala calcarea.

References

External links
 Hypercallia citrinalis at UKmoths

Hypercallia
Moths described in 1763
Moths of Europe
Moths of Asia
Taxa named by Giovanni Antonio Scopoli